Crepidodera lamina is a species of flea beetle from Chrysomelidae family that can be found in France, Portugal, Spain, and North Africa.

References

Beetles described in 1860
Beetles of Europe
Alticini